Badenhorst is an Afrikaans surname. Notable people with the surname include:

Beverley Badenhorst, South African politician 
Brummer Badenhorst (born 1990), South African rugby union player 
Daantjie Badenhorst (born 1967), South African quiz show contestant and writer
Felix Badenhorst (born 1989), Swazi footballer
Gerrit Badenhorst (born 1962), South African powerlifter and strongman competitor
Henry Badenhorst, British businessman
Joany Badenhorst (born 1994), South African-born Australian Paralympian
Pieter Badenhorst, South African Paralympic athlete
Roald Badenhorst (born 1991), South African-born New Zealand cricketer
Skipper Badenhorst (born 1978), South African rugby union player
Witkop Badenhorst (1940-2012), South African Army general

Surnames
Surnames of German origin
German-language surnames
Afrikaans-language surnames